Arctic Thunder is a snowmobile racing game developed by Midway Games. It was released as an arcade game, as well as on the Sony PlayStation 2 and Xbox consoles, and was a launch title for the latter. In the arcade version of the game, jets blow cold or hot winds, depending on the setting, in the player's face during gameplay. Arctic Thunder is part of Midway's Thunder series, which also included Hydro Thunder, 4 Wheel Thunder, Offroad Thunder, and Hydro Thunder Hurricane. The Xbox version of this game is not compatible with the Xbox 360. A Dreamcast port was also planned but was cancelled due to sagging sales of the console.

A website was made available before the game's release. As of 2007, the site is no longer active.

Reception

The Xbox version received "mixed" reviews, while the PlayStation 2 version received "generally unfavorable reviews", according to the review aggregation website Metacritic. Jim Preston of NextGens December 2001 issue said of the latter, "There's plenty of 'Arctic,' but little 'Thunder.' But then, we suppose Snow Snooze wouldn't have been as catchy." The magazine later said in its final issue that the former console version's "only saving grace is that the courses are well enough designed that you rarely get stuck in an alcove or behind a pillar – a frequent, frustrating flaw in racing games. But this doesn't come close to the onscreen mess that makes up most of the gameplay."

AllGame gave the arcade version a score of three-and-a-half stars out of five and said it was "not an unpleasant arcade diversion, and it can be quite entertaining to compete against other players. The levels are clever and distinct, and only the patented Midway cheapness and simplicity will get in the way of your enjoyment."

References

External links
 
 
  *INACTIVE*

2000 video games
Arcade video games
Cancelled Dreamcast games
Midway video games
PlayStation 2 games
Racing video games
Thunder (video game series)
Video games developed in the United States
Xbox games
Multiplayer and single-player video games